George Charles Bingham, 3rd Earl of Lucan,  (16 April 1800 – 10 November 1888), styled Lord Bingham before 1839, was an Anglo-Irish aristocrat and British Army officer. He was one of three men, along with Captain Nolan and Lord Raglan, responsible for the fateful order during the Battle of Balaclava in October 1854 that led to the Light Brigade commander, The Earl of Cardigan, leading the Charge of the Light Brigade. He was subsequently promoted to field marshal.

Lord Lucan was a ruthless landlord during the Great Famine in Ireland, evicting thousands of his Irish tenants and renting his land to wealthy ranchers. He also came up with a solution that allowed Jews to sit in Parliament.

Life and military career

Born the first son of Richard Bingham, 2nd Earl of Lucan, an Anglo-Irish peer, and Elizabeth Bingham (née Belasyse), Lord Bingham (as he was styled up until late June 1839) attended Westminster School but left formal education to be commissioned as an ensign in the 6th Regiment of Foot on 29 August 1816. He transferred to the 11th Light Dragoons on 24 December 1818.

Lord Bingham became a lieutenant in the 8th Regiment of Foot on 20 January 1820, a captain in the 74th Regiment of Foot on 16 May 1822 and was promoted to major, unattached, on 23 June 1825. He transferred to the 17th Lancers on 1 December 1825 and became commanding officer of the regiment with the rank of lieutenant colonel on 9 November 1826; he lavished such expense on his officers' uniforms and horses that the officers became known as "Bingham's Dandies". He was also elected as MP for County Mayo in 1826 and held that seat until 1830. During the Russo-Turkish War, which began in 1828, he acted observer with the Imperial Russian Army.

'The Exterminator'

Lord Bingham succeeded his father as 3rd Earl of Lucan in the Peerage of Ireland on 30 June 1839 and, having become an Irish Representative Peer in June 1840 and having been promoted to colonel on 23 November 1841, he became Lord Lieutenant of Mayo in 1845. During the Great Famine in the late 1840s, he was ruthless and introduced mass evictions from villages such as Ballinrobe. Famously stating that he "would not breed paupers to pay priests," he demolished over 300 homes and evicted 2,000 people in Ballinrobe between 1846 and 1849. He even insisted on closing the workhouse in Castlebar at the height of the Famine. For this, Lord Bingham earned the hatred of many Irishmen and became known as "The Exterminator." He was promoted to major general on 11 November 1851.

Crimean War

At the outbreak of the Crimean War, Lord Lucan applied for a post and was made commander of the Cavalry Division. His brother-in-law, the 7th Earl of Cardigan, was one of his subordinates, commanding the Light Brigade – an unfortunate choice as the two men heartily detested each other. Promoted to brevet lieutenant general on 18 August 1854, he was present at the Battle of Alma in September 1854 but, on the orders of the army commander, Lord Raglan, he held his division in reserve. This incident earned Lucan the undeserved, but persistent, nickname of "Lord Look-on". At the Battle of Balaclava in October 1854, Lucan received an order from Raglan and in turn ordered Cardigan to lead the Charge of the Light Brigade, resulting in heavy British casualties without significant gains. As Lucan brought the Heavy Brigade forward in support, he was lightly wounded in the leg. Raglan blamed Lucan for the loss ("You have lost the light brigade"), and censured him in despatches. Although Lucan complained against this censure, as the relationship between the army commander and the cavalry commander had clearly broken down, he was recalled to England, where he returned at the beginning of March 1855.

On his arrival, Lucan's demand for a court-martial was declined and instead he defended himself with a speech to the House of Lords on 19 March 1855, blaming Raglan and his deceased aide-de-camp, Captain Louis Nolan. This tactic appears to have been successful as he was subsequently appointed Knight Commander of the Order of the Bath on 5 July 1855, and Colonel of the 8th Light Dragoons, who had charged with the Light Brigade, on 17 November 1855.

Later life
A significant contribution was made by Lucan to Parliament when he produced a solution to the problem of admitting Jews to Parliament. Prior to this, distinguished Jews had declined to take the oath "on the true faith of a Christian" and having not been sworn in as required by statute, were refused voting rights although having been elected an MP. Lucan proposed, by way of a compromise, that each House could decide and modify its own oath. The House of Lords, who had long opposed the admission of Jews, agreed to this. A prominent Jew, Lionel Nathan Rothschild, was thus allowed to enter the House of Commons and was sworn in on 26 July 1858.

Although Lucan never again saw active duty, he was promoted to lieutenant general on 24 December 1858, and, having become colonel of the 1st Regiment of Life Guards on 27 February 1865, he was to promoted to general on 28 August 1865 and advanced to Knight Grand Cross of the Order of the Bath in 1869. He formally retired in October 1877, but after some lobbying he was promoted to field marshal on 21 June 1887. He died at 13 South Street, Park Lane, London, on 10 November 1888 and was buried at Laleham in Middlesex.

Family
In 1829, Bingham married Lady Anne Brudenell, seventh daughter of Robert Brudenell, 6th Earl of Cardigan; they had six children, two daughters being still born or dying soon after birth:

Charles, 4th Earl of Lucan. He was married to Cecilia Catherine Gordon-Lennox the daughter of Charles Gordon-Lennox, 5th Duke of Richmond. They had issue.
Augusta (7 February 1832 – 3 July 1888), married her cousin Henry Sturt, 1st Baron Alington on 10 September 1853, and had issue.
Lavinia (circa 1836 – 15 September 1864), married Charles Hardinge, 2nd Viscount Hardinge MP for Downpatrick on 10 April 1856, and had issue.
Rear-Admiral Richard (6 January 1847 – 12 November 1924), married Mary Elizabeth Cole the paternal great-granddaughter of Edward Smith-Stanley, 12th Earl of Derby and maternal granddaughter of Henry Brooke Parnell, 1st Baron Congleton.

Ancestry

References

Sources

Further reading

External links

 
 

1800 births
1888 deaths
17th Lancers officers
8th King's Royal Irish Hussars officers
British Army personnel of the Crimean War
British field marshals
British Life Guards officers
Irish representative peers
Knights Grand Cross of the Order of the Bath
Lord-Lieutenants of Mayo
Politicians from County Mayo
Bingham, George Bingham, Lord
Royal Warwickshire Fusiliers officers
Bingham, George Bingham, Lord
UK MPs who inherited peerages
People educated at Westminster School, London
Burials in Surrey
Recipients of the Order of St. Anna, 2nd class
George
Military personnel from London
Bingham Baronets, of Castlebar